Olakunle George is a Nigerian academic and Associate Professor of English and Africana Studies at Brown University. He previously held the William A. Dyer Jr. Assistant Professorship at Brown University from 1996 to 2002. Previous appointments include Assistant Professorships at the University of Oregon (1992-96) and Northwestern University (1992-1996). He was a fellow of The Institute for Advanced Study at Princeton (1995-1996), and also awarded a fellowship from the National Endowment for the Humanities (1995-1996). He serves on the editorial boards of Ariel: A Review of International English Literature  and Savannah Review (founded by Abiola Irele). He was educated at the University of Ibadan in Nigeria (BA, MA) and Cornell University (MA, PhD). His publications include: African Literature and Social Change: Tribe, Nation, Race(Indiana University Press, 2017); and Relocating Agency: Modernity and African Letters (State University of New York Press, 2003).

References

Living people
Year of birth missing (living people)
Nigerian emigrants to the United States
Brown University faculty
University of Ibadan alumni
Cornell University alumni